Charles Kenneth Willingham (1 December 1912 – May 1975) was a professional footballer, born in Sheffield. As a school boy he captained the Yorkshire Schools' team and won the half-mile county running championship.

Football career
After playing for Ecclesfield, he joined Worksop Town in 1928 at the age of 16. He became a member of Huddersfield's ground staff at Leeds Road in 1930, before signing professionally for Huddersfield Town in 1930, where he spent most of his playing career. Whilst there he played in the 1938 FA Cup Final (which was the first FA Cup Final to be transmitted live on British television) in which Huddersfield Town lost 1–0 to Preston North End.

He holds the record for the fastest ever goal scored by a Huddersfield Town player, against Sunderland on 14 December 1935, putting the ball in the back of the net after just ten seconds, with his fourth touch of the ball. He is also in the top 100 Huddersfield Town players as voted for by the fans as their favourite players.

He was capped twelve times for England, scoring on his debut against Finland in an 8–0 win. He also made six appearances for England during the war, as well as representing the Football League on another six occasions.

After World War II, in which he worked in the steel industry in Sheffield, he signed for Sunderland where he made fourteen appearances. He later signed for Leeds United as a player-coach in 1947 before retiring a year later to become the landlord of the Hopewell Inn in Hunslet. He briefly returned to the game in 1952, where he became coach at Halifax Town.

International career details

Honours
Huddersfield Town
FA Cup finalist – 1938

References

External links
Profile on www.englandstats.com
Profile on www.thefa.com
Sunderland career details
Leeds United career details

1912 births
1975 deaths
Footballers from Sheffield
Association football wing halves
English Football League players
English footballers
England international footballers
England wartime international footballers
Worksop Town F.C. players
Huddersfield Town A.F.C. players
Sunderland A.F.C. players
Leeds United F.C. players
English Football League representative players
Ecclesfield F.C. players
FA Cup Final players